Lee Li-chen is a Taiwanese politician.

Education
Lee obtained her bachelor's degree in public administration in June 1988 and master's degree in economic policy in July 1990 from National Chung Hsing University.

Careers
She was an associate researcher at the Research, Development and Evaluation Commission in 1990-2001, officer, senior officer, section chief, assistant director-general, senior adviser, deputy director-general, director-general of the Department of Economic Affairs of Mainland Affairs Council (MAC) in 1999-2016, deputy secretary-general and spokesperson of Straits Exchange Foundation in 2016-2017 and secretary-general of MAC in 2016-2018.

See also
 Executive Yuan

References

Living people
National Chung Hsing University alumni
Women government ministers of Taiwan
Year of birth missing (living people)